Ligularia przewalskii, also called Przewalski's leopardplant and Przewalski's golden ray, is a species of  tall perennial herbaceous plant in the genus Ligularia and the family Asteraceae, native to damp places in Mongolia and Northern China and named after Nikolai Przhevalsky. It used to be called Senecio przewalskii Maxim. Przewalski's Ligularia is a popular ornamental plant grown for its large, deeply cut foliage and its tall spike-like inflorescences with bright yellow composite flowers blooming from July to August.

In China, Ligularia przewalskii is known as a medicinal plant. Its roots contain thirteen compounds, some with antibacterial activity.

Cultivation
Plants grow best under cool, moist conditions, and resent hot sunny locations where they wilt extensively. They are propagated from seed or by cutting up the crowns.

References

External links
 
 Tropicos.org of Missouri Botanical Garden: Ligularia przewalskii (Maxim.) Diels

przewalskii
Flora of China
Flora of Mongolia
Garden plants